The Anton Rubinstein Competition is the name of a music competition that has existed in two incarnations.  It was first staged in Russia and Western Europe between 1890 and 1910, and prizes were awarded for piano playing and composition.  Since 2003 it has been run in Germany as a piano competition only.

Original competition
The original Anton Rubinstein Competition was staged by Anton Rubinstein himself in 1890. Two prizes of 5000 francs were awarded to the winners in composition and piano.  Winners include:

 1890 ( St. Petersburg): Nikolay Dubasov, piano; Ferruccio Busoni, composition (Concert Piece for Piano and Orchestra, Op. 31a)
 1895 ( Berlin): Josef Lhévinne, piano; Henryk Melcer-Szczawiński, composition (Konzertstück, Piano Trio)
 1900 ( Vienna): Émile Bosquet, piano;Alexander Goedicke, composition
 1905 ( Paris): Wilhelm Backhaus, piano; Attilio Brugnoli composition, (Béla Bartók took second prize).
 1910 ( St. Petersburg): Emil Frey, composition prize (Piano Trio), diploma to Frank Merrick; Alfred Hoehn, piano (Artur Lemba was a piano finalist)

According to The Musical Times of October 1, 1910, the Fifth International Competition for the Rubinstein prize commenced on August 22. Two prizes of 5,000 francs were offered, for composition and for piano playing. The two successful competitors were both German musicians - Emil Frey (as composer; he was actually Swiss) and Alfred Hoehn, professor at the Hoschsche Konservatorium in Frankfurt (as pianist; he was actually Austrian).  Diplomas for excellence in piano playing were awarded to Arthur Rubinstein, Emil Frey and Alexander Borovsky. The Board of Examiners consisted of only Russian musicians. Alexander Glazunov, Chairman of the Jury, presented the awards.

The first prize for pianists graduating from Saint Petersburg Conservatory was named after Rubinstein as well; Maria Yudina recalled that she and her classmate Vladimir Sofronitsky had won the prize in 1920.

Revived competition
Since 2003, the "Anton G. Rubinstein" International Piano Competition has been revived in Dresden, Germany. Winners include:

 2003:  Gabriela Martinez
 2005:    Kateryna Titova
 2007:  Amir Tebenikhin
 2009:  Alexej Gorlatch 
 2012:  Hao Zhu

References

External links 
 Directory of International Piano Competitions
 

Music competitions in Germany
Piano competitions